Aphantochilus is a genus of ant-mimicking crab spiders that was first described by Octavius Pickard-Cambridge in 1871.  it contains three species, found in Paraguay, Brazil, Argentina, and Panama: A. cambridgei, A. inermipes, and A. rogersi. It is a senior synonym of Cryptoceroides.

A. rogersi is polymorphic.

See also
 List of Thomisidae species

References

Further reading

Thomisidae genera
Spiders of South America
Taxa named by Octavius Pickard-Cambridge
Thomisidae